Roberto Marroquin (born August 21, 1989) is an American professional boxer and was signed to Bob Arum's Top Rank.

Amateur career
During his amateur career Marroquin won silver medals at the 2005 National Junior Olympics, 2006 International Aliyev Cup, 2006 National PAL Championships, a Gold medal at the 2006 National Junior Olympics, and another silver medal at the 2008 U.S. Olympic Team Trials. He also has a win over Gary Russell. Marroquin finished with a record of 165-15.

Professional career
In the under card of Manny Pacquiao vs. Joshua Clottey at Cowboys Stadium, Marroquin beat veteran Samuel Sanchez in the second round by K.O.

Professional record

|- style="margin:0.5em auto; font-size:95%;"
| style="text-align:center;" colspan="8"|29 Wins (20 knockouts), 5 Losses, 1 Draw
|-  style="text-align:center; margin:0.5em auto; font-size:95%; background:#e3e3e3;"
|  style="border-style:none none solid solid; "|Res.
|  style="border-style:none none solid solid; "|Record
|  style="border-style:none none solid solid; "|Opponent
|  style="border-style:none none solid solid; "|Type
|  style="border-style:none none solid solid; "|Rd., Time
|  style="border-style:none none solid solid; "|Date
|  style="border-style:none none solid solid; "|Location
|  style="border-style:none none solid solid; "|Notes
|- align=center

|Win || 29-5-1 ||align=left| Darryl Hayes
|MD || 6 || March 26, 2022 ||align=left| Mesquite Arena, Mesquite, Texas
|align=left|
|- align=center
|Win || 28-5-1 ||align=left| Pedro Navarette
|SD || 6 || February 28, 2019 ||align=left| Hanger No.2 Love Field, Dallas, Texas
|align=left|
|- align=center
|Loss || 27-5-1 ||align=left| Rey Perez
|KO || 8 (8), 1:03 || July 28, 2018 ||align=left| Staples Center, Los Angeles, California
|align=left|
|- align=center
|Win || 27-4-1 ||align=left| Ruben Tamayo
|KO || 5 (8), 1:49 || October 14, 2017 ||align=left| Stub Hub Center, Carson, California
|align=left|
|- align=center
|Win || 26-4-1 ||align=left| Jonathan Perez
|KO || 4 (8), 2:23 || June 11, 2017 ||align=left| Pioneer Event Center, Lancaster, California
|align=left|
|- align=center
|Loss || 25-4-1 ||align=left| Carlos Diaz Ramirez
|UD || 10 || May 14, 2016 ||align=left| Gimnasio UAT, Reynosa, Tamaulipas
|align=left|
|- align=center
|Win || 25-3-1 ||align=left| Kuin Evans
|TKO || 2 (8), 2:31 || November 5, 2015 ||align=left| The Empire Room, Dallas, Texas
|align=left|
|- align=center
|Win || 24-3-1 ||align=left| Miguel Soto
|RTD || 4 (8), 0:10 || September 26, 2014 ||align=left| Mesquite Arena, Mesquite, Texas
|align=left|
|- align=center
|style="background: #B0C4DE"|Draw || 23-3-1 ||align=left| Alejandro Rodriguez
|PTS || 8 || February 1, 2014 ||align=left| Laredo Energy Arena, Laredo, Texas
|align=left|
|- align=center
|Loss || 23-3 ||align=left| Daniel Diaz
|SD || 10 || June 29, 2013 ||align=left| WinStar World Casino, Thackerville, Oklahoma
|align=left|
|- align=center
|Win || 23-2 ||align=left| Antonio Escalante
|TKO || 3 (10), 0:49 || March 16, 2013 ||align=left| WinStar World Casino, Thackerville, Oklahoma
|align=left|
|- align=center
|Loss || 22-2 ||align=left| Guillermo Rigondeaux	
|UD || 12 || September 15, 2012 ||align=left| Thomas & Mack Center, Las Vegas, Nevada
|align=left|
|- align=center
|Win || 22-1 ||align=left| Arturo Santiago	
|KO || 2 (8), 1:32 || June 16, 2012 ||align=left| Sun Bowl Stadium, El Paso, Texas
|align=left|
|- align=center
|Win || 21-1 ||align=left| Carlos Valcárcel		
|UD || 10 || December 17, 2011 ||align=left| WinStar World Casino, Thackerville, Oklahoma
|align=left|
|- align=center
|Win || 20-1 ||align=left| Jose Angel Beranza		
|UD || 8 || July 30, 2011 ||align=left| Softball Country Arena, Denver, Colorado
|align=left|
|- align=center
|Loss || 19-1  ||align=left| Francisco Leal	
|SD || 10 || April 23, 2011 ||align=left| WinStar World Casino, Thackerville, Oklahoma
|align=left|
|- align=center
|Win || 19-0 ||align=left| Gilberto Sanchez Leon		
|UD || 8 || February 26, 2011 ||align=left| Palms Casino Resort, Las Vegas, Nevada
|align=left|
|- align=center
|Win || 18-0 ||align=left| Eduardo Arcos	
|TKO || 4 (8), 1:21 || January 22, 2011 ||align=left| Texas Station, North Las Vegas, Nevada
|align=left|
|- align=center
|Win || 17-0 ||align=left| Francisco Dominguez
|TKO || 1 (6), 1:27 || November 13, 2010 || align=left| Cowboys Stadium, Arlington, Texas
|align=left|
|- align=center
|Win || 16-0 ||align=left| Rafael Cerrillo
|UD || 6 || October 16, 2010 || align=left| Estadio de Beisbol, Monterrey, Nuevo León
|align=left|
|- align=center
|Win || 15-0 ||align=left| Jesus Quintero
|TKO || 3 (8), 1:40 || August 7, 2010 || align=left| Estadio Hector Espino, Hermosillo, Sonora
|align=left|
|- align=center
|Win || 14-0 ||align=left| Arturo Camargo
|KO || 2 (6), 2:20 || May 15, 2010 || align=left| Estadio Centenario, Los Mochis, Sinaloa
|align=left|
|- align=center
|Win || 13-0 ||align=left| Samuel Sanchez
|KO || 2 (6), 1:36 || March 13, 2010 || align=left| Cowboys Stadium, Arlington, Texas
|align=left|
|- align=center
|Win || 12-0 || align=left| Robert Guillen
|TKO || 1 (6), 2:30 || February 6, 2010 || align=left| Convention Center, McAllen, Texas
|align=left|
|- align=center
|Win || 11-0 || align=left| Anthony Napunyi
|TKO || 3 (6), 0:31 || November 13, 2009 || align=left| Mandalay Bay House of Blues, Las Vegas, Nevada
|align=left|
|- align=center
|Win || 10-0 || align=left| Jose Garcia Bernal
|UD || 6 || October 17, 2009 || align=left| Whataburger Field, Corpus Christi, Texas
|align=left|
|- align=center
|Win || 9-0 || align=left| Steven Johnson
|TKO || 2 (6), 1:40 || August 29, 2009 || align=left| Quick Trip Ballpark, Grand Prairie, Texas
|align=left|
|- align=center
|Win || 8-0 || align=left| Jose Manuel Garcia
|TKO || 3 (6), 1:27 || June 19, 2009 || align=left| Dr Pepper Arena, Frisco, Texas
|align=left|
|- align=center
|Win || 7-0 || align=left| Robert DaLuz
|UD || 6 || May 16, 2009 || align=left| Buffalo Bill's Star Arena, Primm, Nevada
|align=left|
|- align=center
|Win || 6-0 || align=left| Julio Valadez
|KO || 4 (4), 2:15 || May 1, 2009 || align=left| Hard Rock Hotel and Casino, Las Vegas, Nevada
|align=left|
|- align=center
|Win || 5-0 || align=left| Isaac Hidalgo
|TKO || 1 (6), 2:46 || December 6, 2008 || align=left| MGM Grand, Las Vegas, Nevada
|align=left|
|- align=center
|Win || 4-0 || align=left| Gino Escamilla
|UD || 6 || November 5, 2008 || align=left| Isleta Casino & Resort, Albuquerque, New Mexico
|align=left|
|- align=center
|Win || 3-0 || align=left| Roberto Perez
|RTD || 2 (4), 0:10 || July 11, 2008 || align=left| American Bank Center, Corpus Christi, Texas
|align=left|
|- align=center
|Win || 2-0 || align=left| Luis Angel Paneto
|TKO || 2 (4), 0:02 || February 29, 2008 || align=left| Municipal Auditorium, Harlingen, Texas
|align=left|
|- align=center
|Win || 1-0 || align=left| Genaro Castorena
|RTD || 2 (4), 0:10 || January 18, 2008 || align=left| Jacob Brown Auditorium, Brownsville, Texas
|align=left|
|- align=center

References

External links

American boxers of Mexican descent
Super-bantamweight boxers
1989 births
Living people
American male boxers